Piotr Michalik (born 20 May 1957) is a bantamweight Greco-Roman wrestler from Poland who won a world title in 1982 and a bronze medal at the 1981 European Championships. He continued competing in wrestling in the 2000s, in the masters category. His elder brother Jan is also an international Greco-Roman wrestler.

References

1957 births
Living people
Polish male sport wrestlers
Sportspeople from Katowice
20th-century Polish people
21st-century Polish people